Light Up the Sky may refer to:

 Light Up the Sky (album), an album by the Afters
 Light Up the Sky (EP), an EP by Rick Wakeman
 "Light Up the Sky" (The Afters song)
 "Light Up the Sky" (Christina Aguilera song)
 "Light Up the Sky" (Van Halen song)
 "Light Up the Sky" (Yellowcard song)
 Light Up the Sky by Wooli & Trivecta Featuring Scott Stapp
 Light Up the Sky! (film), a 1960 British comedy film
 Light Up the Sky (play), a 1948 Broadway play by Moss Hart